Alvin Jacob Powell (July 15, 1908 – November 4, 1948), was an outfielder for the Washington Senators (1930, 1934–1936 and 1943–1945), New York Yankees (1936–1940) and Philadelphia Phillies (1945).

Career
Powell helped the Yankees win the World Series every year from 1936 to 1939 and batted .455 in the 1936 series. In eleven seasons, he played in 688 games and had 2,540 at bats, 353 runs, 689 hits, 116 doubles, 26 triples, 22 home runs, 327 RBIs, 65 stolen bases, 173 walks, a .271 batting average, .320 on-base percentage, .363 slugging percentage, 923 total bases and 43 sacrifice hits. Defensively, he recorded a .975 fielding percentage.

He played in 31 games in 1939. On April 10, 1940, the Yankees were working their way north after spring training in Florida and stopped in Ashland, Ky., to play an exhibition game. Powell was pursuing a fly ball when he crashed into an iron light pole and suffered a head injury, most likely a concussion and possibly a fractured skull.

Powell was sidelined until July 15 and was limited to playing in 12 games for the 1940 Yankees.

Powell spent the next two seasons (1941-42) in the minors before he returned to the big leagues with the Senators in 1943. In the fall of 1944 – during World War II – Powell served as an emergency police officer in Montgomery County, Maryland.

In July 1945, the Senators sent Powell to the Phillies. He had a hit and a RBI in each game of a doubleheader against the Cardinals on Sept. 16, 1945, at St. Louis. He was retired in 1946.  In 1948, Powell tried to make a comeback, playing in 31 games for the Gainesville G-Men of the Florida State League, but batted just .220.

Controversy 
Throughout his career, Powell had been involved in a number of controversies on and off the field. While playing for the 1936 World Series team, he received a $5,000 check, which he later gambled away. He also stole various items out of hotel rooms during his baseball days. During a dugout interview in a July 1938 game versus the Chicago White Sox at Comiskey Park, Powell was asked by WGN radio announcer Bob Elson how he stayed in shape during the off-season. Powell – who claimed to be a policeman in his hometown of Dayton, Ohio (but in reality had only applied without being hired) – replied that he kept in shape by "cracking niggers over the head with my blackjack." He was subsequently suspended for 10 days by Commissioner Kenesaw Mountain Landis, for making "an uncomplimentary reference to a portion of the population." He was later ordered by the Yankees to walk through Harlem as an act of apology, accompanied by noted Black aviator Hubert Julian. Powell was later accused of purposefully colliding with Jewish star Hank Greenberg, costing Greenberg his season after only 12 games with a broken wrist.

In November 1948, Powell was arrested in Washington, D.C. for passing bad checks. He drew a revolver while at a police station and committed suicide.

References

External links

1908 births
1948 suicides
Major League Baseball outfielders
Washington Senators (1901–1960) players
New York Yankees players
Philadelphia Phillies players
Baseball players from Maryland
People from Silver Spring, Maryland
Suicides by firearm in Washington, D.C.
American police officers
Albany Senators players
Binghamton Triplets players
Chattanooga Lookouts players
Dayton Ducks players
Gainesville G-Men players
Harrisburg Senators players
Indianapolis Indians players
Montreal Royals players
American expatriate baseball players in Canada
New Haven Profs players
San Francisco Seals (baseball) players
Springfield Ponies players
St. Paul Saints (AA) players
Wilkes-Barre Barons (baseball) players
Youngstown Buckeyes players
Multiple gunshot suicides